Suscal Canton is a canton of Ecuador, located in the Cañar Province.  Its capital is the town of Suscal.  Its population at the 2001 census was 4,419.

References

Cantons of Cañar Province